Pedro Munhoz (born September 7, 1986) is a Brazilian mixed martial artist currently fighting in the Bantamweight division in the Ultimate Fighting Championship. He is the former Bantamweight Champion of Resurrection Fighting Alliance. As of March 13, 2023, he is #10 in the UFC bantamweight rankings.

Background
Munhoz began training Shotokan karate at the age of six, picking up judo a couple of years later before starting to train Brazilian jiu-jitsu at the age of 13.

Mixed martial arts career

Early career
A professional since 2009, Munhoz began his career competing in local promotions in his native São Paulo, Brazil before moving to the United States in 2011. He competed in several regional promotions across the United States, compiling an undefeated record and eventually became Resurrection Fighting Alliance bantamweight champion on August 16, 2013, after defeating notable veteran Jeff Curran by split decision. Munhoz defended his title for the first time on January 24, 2014, defeating Billy Daniels via first round submission. After the victory over Daniels, Munhoz signed with the UFC in early February 2014.

Ultimate Fighting Championship

2014
Munhoz made his promotional debut on February 22, 2014, as a short notice replacement for an injured Francisco Rivera and faced top contender Raphael Assunção at UFC 170. Assunção defeated Munhoz via unanimous decision.

Munhoz faced promotional newcomer Matt Hobar on May 31, 2014, at The Ultimate Fighter Brazil 3 Finale. Munhoz defeated Hobar via first round TKO.

Munhoz faced Jerrod Sanders on October 4, 2014, at UFC Fight Night 54. He won the fight via submission in the first round. A few months later, it was revealed that Munhoz tested positive for elevated levels of testosterone. Munhoz's camp requested testing documentation and didn't receive it until three months later. He said a review of the results by anti-doping specialist Paul Scott determined that his testosterone was not, in fact, elevated, coming in at 850 ng/mL, or on the high end of the normal range for men his age. He admitted to using two supplements allowed by the UFC that may have elevated his testosterone, but not outside the legal limit. On November 4, 2015, Munhoz was suspended for one year retroactive to his fight due to testosterone metabolites of an exogenous origin and his win was changed to a no-contest.

2015
Munhoz faced Jimmie Rivera on November 7, 2015, at UFC Fight Night 77. He lost the fight via split decision.

2016
Munhoz next faced Russell Doane on July 7, 2016, at UFC Fight Night: dos Anjos vs. Alvarez. He won the fight via submission in the first round and was awarded a Performance of the Night bonus.

Munhoz faced Justin Scoggins on November 19, 2016, at UFC Fight Night 100. He won the bout submission in the second round and was awarded a Performance of the Night bonus.

2017
Munhoz faced Damian Stasiak on May 28, 2017, at UFC Fight Night: Gustafsson vs. Teixeira. He won the fight by unanimous decision.

Munhoz faced Rob Font on October 28, 2017, at UFC Fight Night: Brunson vs. Machida. He won the fight via submission in round one. This win earned him a Performance of the Night bonus award.

2018
Munhoz was expected to face John Dodson at UFC Fight Night: Machida vs. Anders on February 3, 2018. However, Munhoz missed weight by four pounds over the bantamweight non title fight upper limit of 136 pounds, and Dodson declined to take the fight and the fight was cancelled. The fight was rescheduled to UFC 222 on March 3, 2018. Munhoz lost the fight via split decision.

Munhoz faced Brett Johns August 4, 2018, at UFC 227. He won the fight by unanimous decision after knocking Johns down several times during the bout.

Munhoz faced Bryan Caraway on November 30, 2018, at The Ultimate Fighter 28 Finale. He won the fight via technical knockout in round one.

2019
Munhoz faced former UFC Bantamweight Champion Cody Garbrandt on March 2, 2019, at UFC 235. He won the fight via knockout in the first round. The win also earned Munhoz his first Fight of the Night bonus award.

Munhoz faced Aljamain Sterling on June 8, 2019, at UFC 238. He lost the fight by unanimous decision.

2020
Munhoz was scheduled to face former UFC Lightweight Champion Frankie Edgar on July 15, 2020, at UFC on ESPN: Kattar vs. Ige. However, on July 6, it was announced that Munhoz was pulled from the bout after testing positive for COVID-19. The pairing was redscheduled and took place on August 22, 2020 at UFC on ESPN 15. Munhoz lost the back-and-forth fight via split decision. This fight earned him the Fight of the Night award.

2021
A rematch against Jimmie Rivera was scheduled on January 30, 2021 at UFC on ESPN 20. On December 26, 2020, it was announced that the bout was moved to January 20, 2021 at UFC on ESPN 20. The pairing was rescheduled once again in early January as they were moved to UFC 258 on February 13, 2021 due to undisclosed reasons. During the week leading up to the event, the bout was delayed again due to a positive COVID-19 test for someone within the two camps. The pairing remained intact and took place two weeks later at UFC Fight Night: Rozenstruik vs. Gane. Munhoz won the fight via unanimous decision. This bout earned him a Fight of the Night bonus award.

Munhoz faced José Aldo on August 7, 2021 at UFC 265. He lost the fight via unanimous decision.

Munhoz faced Dominick Cruz on December 11, 2021 at UFC 269. Despite knocking Cruz down twice and almost finishing him in the first round, Munhoz ultimately lost the fight via unanimous decision. The bout earned the Fight of the Night bonus award.

2022

Munhoz faced Sean O'Malley on July 2, 2022, at UFC 276. It was ruled a no contest in the second round due to an inadvertent eye poke that rendered Munhoz unable to continue. Following the bout, Munhoz published his medical record showing that he suffered an abrasion across his right cornea.

2023 
Munhoz is scheduled to face Chris Gutiérrez on April 15, 2023 at UFC on ESPN 44.

Personal life
Munhoz has two daughters: one from a previous relationship and one with his wife, Varinea.

Championships and accomplishments
Ultimate Fighting Championship
Performance of the Night (Three times)
Fight of the Night (Four times)
Tied (Raphael Assunção) for most bouts in UFC Bantamweight division history (18)
Tied (Sean O'Malley) for second most post-fight bonuses in UFC Bantamweight division history (7)
Resurrection Fighting Alliance
RFA Bantamweight Championship (One time)
One successful title defense

Mixed martial arts record

|NC
|align=center|19–7 (2)
|Sean O'Malley
|NC (accidental eye poke)
|UFC 276
| 
|align=center|2
|align=center|3:09
|Las Vegas, Nevada, United States
|
|-
|Loss
|align=center|19–7 (1)
|Dominick Cruz
|Decision (unanimous)
|UFC 269
|
|align=center|3
|align=center|5:00
|Las Vegas, Nevada, United States
|
|-
|Loss
|align=center|19–6 (1)
|José Aldo
|Decision (unanimous)
|UFC 265 
|
|align=center|3
|align=center|5:00
|Houston, Texas, United States
|
|-
|Win
|align=center|19–5 (1)
|Jimmie Rivera
|Decision (unanimous)
|UFC Fight Night: Rozenstruik vs. Gane 
|
|align=center|3
|align=center|5:00
|Las Vegas, Nevada, United States
|
|-
|Loss
|align=center|18–5 (1)
|Frankie Edgar
|Decision (split)
|UFC on ESPN: Munhoz vs. Edgar
|
|align=center|5
|align=center|5:00
|Las Vegas, Nevada, United States
|
|-
|Loss
|align=center|18–4 (1)
|Aljamain Sterling
|Decision (unanimous)
|UFC 238 
|
|align=center|3
|align=center|5:00
|Chicago, Illinois, United States
|
|-
|Win
|align=center|18–3 (1)
|Cody Garbrandt
|TKO (punches)
|UFC 235
|
|align=center|1
|align=center|4:51
|Las Vegas, Nevada, United States
|
|-
|Win
|align=center|17–3 (1)
|Bryan Caraway
|TKO (body kick and punches)
|The Ultimate Fighter: Heavy Hitters Finale
|
|align=center|1
|align=center|2:39
|Las Vegas, Nevada, United States
|
|-
|Win
|align=center|16–3 (1)
|Brett Johns
|Decision (unanimous)
|UFC 227
|
|align=center|3
|align=center|5:00
|Los Angeles, California, United States
|
|-
|Loss
|align=center|15–3 (1)
|John Dodson
|Decision (split)
|UFC 222
|
|align=center|3
|align=center|5:00
|Las Vegas, Nevada, United States
|
|-
|Win
|align=center|15–2 (1)
|Rob Font
|Submission (guillotine choke)
|UFC Fight Night: Brunson vs. Machida
|
|align=center|1
|align=center|4:03
|São Paulo, Brazil
|
|-
|Win
|align=center|14–2 (1)
|Damian Stasiak
|Decision (unanimous)
|UFC Fight Night: Gustafsson vs. Teixeira
|
|align=center|3
|align=center|5:00
|Stockholm, Sweden
|
|-
|Win
|align=center|13–2 (1)
|Justin Scoggins
|Submission (guillotine choke)
|UFC Fight Night: Bader vs. Nogueira 2
|
|align=center|2
|align=center|1:55
|São Paulo, Brazil
|
|-
|Win
|align=center|12–2 (1)
|Russell Doane
|Submission (guillotine choke)
|UFC Fight Night: dos Anjos vs. Alvarez
|
|align=center|1
|align=center|2:08
|Las Vegas, Nevada, United States
|
|-
| Loss
| align=center| 11–2 (1)
| Jimmie Rivera
| Decision (split)
| UFC Fight Night: Belfort vs. Henderson 3
| 
| align=center| 3
| align=center| 5:00
| São Paulo, Brazil
| 
|-
| NC
| align=center| 11–1 (1)
| Jerrod Sanders
| NC (overturned)
| UFC Fight Night: MacDonald vs. Saffiedine
| 
| align=center| 1
| align=center| 0:39
| Halifax, Nova Scotia, Canada
| 
|-
| Win
| align=center| 11–1
| Matt Hobar
| TKO (punches)
| The Ultimate Fighter Brazil 3 Finale: Miocic vs. Maldonado
| 
| align=center| 1
| align=center| 2:47
| São Paulo, Brazil
| 
|-
| Loss
| align=center| 10–1
| Raphael Assunção
| Decision (unanimous)
| UFC 170
| 
| align=center| 3
| align=center| 5:00
| Las Vegas, Nevada, United States
| 
|-
| Win
| align=center| 10–0
| Billy Daniels
| Submission (guillotine choke)
| RFA 12
| 
| align=center| 1
| align=center| 0:41
| Los Angeles, California, United States
| 
|-
| Win
| align=center| 9–0
| Jeff Curran
| Decision (split)
| RFA 9
| 
| align=center| 5
| align=center| 5:00
| Carson, California, United States
| 
|-
| Win
| align=center| 8–0
| Mitch Jackson
| Submission (guillotine choke)
| RFA 8
| 
| align=center| 1
| align=center| 4:49
| Milwaukee, Wisconsin, United States
| 
|-
| Win
| align=center| 7–0
| Bill Kamery
| Submission (heel hook)
| RFA 5
| 
| align=center| 1
| align=center| 2:27
| Kearney, Nebraska, United States
| 
|-
| Win
| align=center| 6–0
| Camilo Gonzalez
| Submission (guillotine choke)
| RITC: Respect in the Cage
| 
| align=center| 2
| align=center| 1:21
| Pomona, California, United States
| 
|-
| Win
| align=center| 5–0
| Richard Montalvo
| Submission (rear naked-choke)
| MMA Xplosion: International Team Challenge
| 
| align=center| 2
| align=center| 2:31
| Las Vegas, Nevada, United States
| 
|-
| Win
| align=center| 4–0
| Mauro Brenes
| Decision (unanimous)
| RITC: Respect in the Cage
| 
| align=center| 3
| align=center| 5:00
| Pomona, California, United States
| 
|-
| Win
| align=center| 3–0
| Pablo Alfonso
| Decision (unanimous)
| Jungle Fight 18: São Paulo
| 
| align=center| 3
| align=center| 5:00
| São Paulo, Brazil
| 
|-
| Win
| align=center| 2–0
| Roberto Matsumoto
| TKO (retirement)
| EFC: Eagle Fighting Championship
| 
| align=center| 2
| align=center| 5:00
| São Paulo, Brazil
| 
|-
| Win
| align=center| 1–0
| Reginaldo Vieira
| TKO (submission to punches)
| FF: Full Fight 1
| 
| align=center| 2
| align=center| 3:35
| São Paulo, Brazil
|

See also
 List of current UFC fighters
 List of male mixed martial artists

References

External links
 

1986 births
Living people
Brazilian expatriate sportspeople in the United States
Brazilian male mixed martial artists
Bantamweight mixed martial artists
Brazilian sportspeople in doping cases
Doping cases in mixed martial arts
Mixed martial artists utilizing Shotokan
Mixed martial artists utilizing judo
Mixed martial artists utilizing Brazilian jiu-jitsu
Sportspeople from São Paulo
Ultimate Fighting Championship male fighters
Brazilian male karateka
Brazilian male judoka
People awarded a black belt in Brazilian jiu-jitsu
Brazilian practitioners of Brazilian jiu-jitsu